Neopediasia is a monotypic moth genus of the family Crambidae described by Masao Okano in 1962. Its only species, Neopediasia mixtalis, described by Francis Walker in 1863, is found in the Russian Far East, China (Sichuan, Shensi, Yunnan, Shantung, Kansu, Kiangsu, Manchuria), Korea and Japan.

The wingspan is 10–13 mm.

The larvae feed on Panicum species.

References

Crambinae
Crambidae genera
Monotypic moth genera